Wang Bin may refer to:

Wang Bin (footballer), Chinese footballer
Wang Bin (executive), Chinese business executive
Bin Wang (meteorologist), Chinese meteorologist
Tian Bing, born Wang Bin, Chinese wrestler